Antaeotricha atmospora is a moth of the family Depressariidae. It is found in Colombia.

The wingspan is 38–39 mm. The forewings are pale greyish-ochreous sprinkled with dark brown specks, these forming a darker cloud towards the median area of the dorsum. The second discal stigma is rather large and dark fuscous and the terminal dots are sometimes slightly indicated. The hindwings are pale grey.

References

Moths described in 1925
atmospora
Taxa named by Edward Meyrick
Moths of South America